XHQG-FM is a radio station on 107.9 FM in La Noria, serving Querétaro, Querétaro, Mexico.

History
XHQG began as XEQG-AM 980 (later 670), awarded to Radio Querétaro, S.A., on August 24, 1967. It initially broadcast with 1,000 watts day and 150 watts night.

The station broadcasts from Cerro El Cimatario, which is a common transmitter site for TV stations serving Santiago de Querétaro. It moved there in 2007 as part of an AM power increase to 10 kW; on FM, it is authorized for the low power of 500 watts with a height above average terrain of more than 250 meters. Around this time, the concession was transferred to México Radio.

In April 2021, NTR acquired the ABC Radio network from OEM. XHQG was rebranded as "107.9 FM", dropping the "ABC" name, until it was renamed  in 2022 as part of a groupwide rollout of the name.

References

Radio stations in Querétaro